Haucourt is a commune in the Seine-Maritime department in the Normandy region in northern France.

Geography

Population

Places of interest
 The sixteenth-century château.
 Vestiges of a priory at the hamlet of Pierrement.
 A former military headquarters building and thirteenth-century chapel at Villedieu
 The church of St. Leonard, dating from the twelfth century.

See also
Communes of the Seine-Maritime department

References

Communes of Seine-Maritime